Diyawadana Nilame is the office of the chief lay custodian of the Temple of the Tooth, Kandy, Sri Lanka. Formerly an office of the royal household, at present it is the trustee for the Temple of the Tooth as defined by the Buddhist Temporalities Ordinance of 1931. A ceremonial position, enriched with over two thousand years of history to protect and carry out ancient rituals for the relic of the tooth of the Buddha. The Diyawadana Nilame recognised as a states man has the responsibility of overseeing of all aspects of the Sri Dalada Maligawa. He has the traditional duty of organizing the annual pageant, the Kandy Esala Perahera. The current Diyawadana Nilame is Pradeep Nilanga Dela.

Prior to 1815, during the Kingdom of Kandy, the Diyawadana Nilame was a courtier of the royal court tasked with supplying the King with water and carrying out the ancient rituals to ensure rain during correct seasons. This duty is still carried out by the Diyawadana Nilame for the most relic of the tooth of the Buddha, marked by the water cutting ceremony on the final day of the Esala Perahera.

Appointment
The appointment of the Diyawadana Nilame is carried out under the provisions of the Buddhist Temporalities Ordinance of 1931 by the Commissioner General of Buddhist Affairs. On the vacancy occurs in the office of the Diyawadana Nilame, the Commissioner-General of Buddhist Affairs within three months will summon to a meeting in Kandy to appoint the new Diyawadana Nilame. Summoned to the meeting are;
Mahanayaka Theras (Chief Priest) of Malwatta Vihare and Asgiriya Vihare;
Assistant Government Agents holding office within the Kandyan provinces;
Basnayaka Nilames of all dewales situated within the Kandyan provinces;
Trustees of all temples within the Kandyan provinces of which the annual income during the three preceding years is estimated by the Commissioner-General of Buddhist Affairs at over one thousand rupees;

The Commissioner General of Buddhist Affairs will preside at this meeting. If only one name is proposed and seconded for election, the Commissioner-General will declare such person appointed to the office of Diyawadana Nilame. If more than one name is proposed and seconded for election a secret ballot will be held and the Commissioner-General of Buddhist Affairs will declare the person who receives the highest number of votes at the ballot appointed to the office of Diyawadana Nilame. This will be followed by a written declaration of the appointment by the Commissioner-General within one month.

History
The Diyawadana Nilame is now elected by a far-flung electorate comprising the venerable Mahanayake Theras of the Malwatte and Asgiriya Chapters. Trustees of Buddhist Temples with an annual income of Rs. 1,000/- and registered with the Public Trustee and the divisional revenue officers (now Sri Lanka Administrative Service Officers) in the Kandy areas. These officers have to be Buddhists and male. Lady Administrative Service officers are not eligible to vote. Each term of an elected Diyawadana Nilame is 10 years and he may run for a second term.

It was a Board of Commissioners that had administered the Kandyan Province until AD 1832. Colebrook and Cameron, who recommended the unification of the administration of the country, wrote:

The matters relating to the Dalada, Asgiriya, Malwatte, Devalaya, Nilames etc., were discussed at length in the British Cabinet in 1853 AD. The Duke of Newcastle, the Secretary of State for the Colonies wrote to Sir George Anderson, the Governor of Ceylon on 18 August 1853, as follows regarding the future custodian of Dalada and the election of the Diyawadana Nilame:

Temple of the Tooth had been managed for the longest period by the Nugawela family, who have served the post of Diyawadana Nilame of the Temple of the Tooth for six decades from 1901 to 1961. C. B. Nugawela of Eladatta Walauwa, father of the first Adigar, the late Sir Lawrenece Nugawela, is credited for doing a considerable amount of work for the Temple of the Tooth: '...during his period of office he built the front portion of the Dalada Maligawa and also a temple for the priests performing "Thevava" to the Sacred Tooth Relic.' Similarly, P.B Nugawela, the father of a former Minister of Education, the late Major E. A. Nugawela, contributed immensely to the development of the Temple of the Tooth: "He was responsible for introducing ves dancers to the perahera. He also built a three-story extension to the Maligawa with the help of a Burmese priest..."

Diyawadana Nilames since 1814
 Kapuwatte Adikaram (1814–1824)
 Dehigama Loku Banda (1824–1827)
 Kuda Molligoda (1827–1828 )
 Kuda Dehigama (1828–1835)
 Mullegama Adikaram (1835–1842)
 Dullewe Adikaram (1842–1848)
 Loku Banda Dehigama (1848–1862)
 Kuda Banda Dunuvila (1862–1882)
 Kudamudiyanse Giragama (1882–1897)
 Seneviratna Ratwatte (1897–1901)
 Kuda Bandara Nugawela (1901–1916)
 Punchi Banda Nugawela (1916–1937)
 Tikiri Banda Nugawela (1937–1947)
 Kuda Banda Nugawela (1947–1961) 
 Harris Leuke Ratwatte (1961–1964)
 H. B. Udurawana (1964–1975)
 Dr. Nissanka Wijeyeratne (1975–1985)
 Neranjan Wijeyeratne (1985–2005)
 Pradeep Nilanga Dela (2005–present )

Acting Diyawadana Nilames since 1814
Acting Diyawadana Nilames appointed by the Commissioner General of Buddhist Affairs with recommendation from Mahanayaka Theras of the Malwatte & Asgiriya Chapters.
 General Anuruddha Ratwatte
 Anuradha Dullewe Wijeyeratne
 Rohan Salinda Paranagama

See also
Kandy Esala Perahera
Relic of the tooth of the Buddha
Sri Dalada Maligawa, Kandy
Cetiya
Dāṭhavaṃsa

References

External links
  Sri Lanka: Odyssey of the 'Tooth Relic of the Buddha', Permanent Mission of Sri Lanka - Geneva - Switzerland
SACRED TOOTH RELIC IN SENKADAGALA (KANDY)
Esala Perahera
The unforgettable Heen Banda Udurawana Diyawadana Nilame
Biography of Hon.  H.B. Udurawana (The 16th Diyawadana Nilame of the Temple of the Tooth)

 
Buddhism in Sri Lanka
Ceremonial officers in Sri Lanka
Kingdom of Kandy
Sri Lankan religious leaders
Buddhist religious occupations